Yarragadee Station is a pastoral lease that currently operates as a cattle station.

The property was established by Michael Morrissey at some time prior to 1886 and was well known by that time.

Francis Pearse, who already owned a store in the area, acquired Yarragadee in 1903, paying £10,600 for it.

Yarragadee is near Yatharagga - an area associated with a number of space related tracking systems.

See also 
 List of ranches and stations

References 

Pastoral leases in Western Australia
Stations (Australian agriculture)
Mid West (Western Australia)